Barum woman (died 7010–6540 BCE, also known as Bäckaskogskvinna) was a Mesolithic woman whose skeleton was found in 1939 in , Sweden and is now in the Swedish History Museum in Stockholm.

Her skeleton was found in 1939 on the shore of  lake at  village,  near Bäckaskog in the province of Scania, and on the property of Bäckaskog Castle. She was believed to be male, and was called The Fisher from Barum because flint arrows believed to be used for fishing were found in the grave. When it was established in the 1970s that she was female, she was renamed Bäckaskogskvinna (Bäckaskog woman), and in 2016 the museum renamed her as Kvinnan från Barum (The woman from Barum) to reflect local wishes in Scania province, and in line with a 2015 book published with the title Kvinnan från Barum - från äldre stenåldern ("The woman from Barum - from the older Stone Age") by Björn Wallebom, an archaeologist at the museum. In English-language sources the terms "Barum woman" and "Woman from Barum" are both used.

She was found in 1939 by farmers digging for gravel, who removed her skull and some other bones. A professional archaeologist Folke Hansen then excavated the rest of the skeleton, made a drawing and took three photographs, and wrote up his findings.  She has been exhibited in the Swedish History Museum since 1943 and is regarded as one of the highlights of its prehistory collection. 

In 1970, Gjevall re-examined the skeleton and declared it to be female, with the pelvis showing signs of childbirth. In 1996, the skeleton underwent more investigation with a view to its conservation, and this was described in a paper in Fornvännen in 2000. Sten et al wrote that an analysis of her bones  had given a height  and age at death of 40-45 years, while an assessment of her teeth had indicated an age at death of 32–40 years; her diet had been mainly terrestrial, and her burial took place in the spring (from pollen analysis) in the period 7010–6540 BCE.

References

Further reading
 
  First description of the skeleton

7th-millennium BC people
Ancient European women
Swedish women
1939 archaeological discoveries